The 2016 Red Bull MotoGP Rookies Cup was the tenth season of the Red Bull MotoGP Rookies Cup. After the selection event held from 16 to 18 October 2015 at Circuito Guadix in Spain and pre-season testing, held from 1 to 4 April 2016 in Jerez, the season began at the same track on 23 April and ended on 25 September at the Ciudad del Motor de Aragón after 13 races. The races, for the fourth year contested by the riders on equal KTM 250cc 4-stroke Moto3 bikes, were held at seven meetings on the Grand Prix motorcycle racing calendar. The championship was won by Japanese rider Ayumu Sasaki at the last race.

Calendar

Entry list

Championship standings
Points were awarded to the top fifteen riders, provided the rider finished the race.

References

External links
 

Red Bull MotoGP Rookies Cup
Red Bull MotoGP Rookies Cup racing seasons